Sarah Jones (born 3 April 1983) is a Scottish freestyle wrestler.

Born in Edinburgh, Scotland, she represented Scotland at the 2010 Commonwealth Games, New Delhi in the 72kg category placing 4th.

Achievements

References
  on Commonwealth Games Scotland
  on The-Sports.org
 Scottishwrestling.org on Scottish Wrestling Association

1983 births
Living people
Scottish female wrestlers
Wrestlers at the 2010 Commonwealth Games 
Commonwealth Games competitors for Scotland 
Sportspeople from Edinburgh